The Australian Greens frontbench consists of all Greens members of Parliament serving as the party's spokespeople inside Parliament on various issues, each member being assigned shadow portfolios for their speaking duties. This allows the Greens to shadow government policies and actions from the party perspective.

The frontbench led by Adam Bandt follows on from the frontbench of Richard Di Natale, former Greens leader. Under the new leadership of Adam Bandt, for the first time ever the party's leader sits in the lower house. Some of the major changes in this arrangement included the Foreign Affairs portfolio being reallocated from Di Natale to Bandt, while new portfolios were created for Larissa Waters and Mehreen Faruqi to represent the leader on various issues in the Senate. The NBN was added to the digital rights and IT portfolio held by Nick McKim, and portfolios formerly held by Bandt were assigned to Janet Rice. Tourism and Gambling were reallocated from Waters to Sarah Hanson-Young and Rachel Siewert, respectively. A new portfolio of Dental Health was also added to Hanson-Young's responsibilities, which the Senator welcomed, stating she could not "wait to sink her teeth into it".

After the resignation of Rachel Siewert, and preparing for the 2022 federal election, a reshuffle of portfolios was announced. Some changes in this arrangement included Nick McKim becoming the Party Whip, the Health portfolio being combined with the Dental Health and Mental Health portfolios and allocated to Jordon Steele-John, and the Family, Ageing and Community Services and Gambling portfolios previously held by Siewert being allocated to Janet Rice and Sarah Hanson-Young, respectively. The Public Sector portfolio was reallocated from Adam Bandt to Larissa Waters, with the Mining and Resources portfolio reassigned from Waters to Dorinda Cox. Also allocated to Cox was the Trade portfolio from Steele-John, and the  Science, Research and Innovation portfolio from Rice. Bandt stated that this reshuffle "will give the Greens the best chance of kicking the government out".

Current arrangement 
A new arrangement was announced following the 2022 election.

Previous arrangements led by Adam Bandt

Third arrangement
The frontbench was rearranged following the resignation of Rachel Siewert and the appointment of Dorinda Cox.

Second arrangement
The frontbench was rearranged following the resignation of Richard Di Natale and the appointment of Lidia Thorpe.

First arrangement
The frontbench was rearranged following the election of Adam Bandt as party leader.

References

External links
 Green MPs and Senators

2020 establishments in Australia